A lifting hook is a device for grabbing and lifting loads by means of a device such as a hoist or crane. A lifting hook is usually equipped with a safety latch to prevent the disengagement of the lifting wire rope sling, chain or rope to which the load is attached.

A hook may have one or more built-in pulley sheaves as a block and tackle to multiply the lifting force.

See also

References 

 American Society of Mechanical Engineers: ASME B30.10 "Hooks" (2014).

Lifting equipment